Doddiana tonkinalis is a species of snout moth. It was described by Pierre Viette in 1960 and is found in Vietnam.

References

Epipaschiinae
Moths described in 1960